Keda is an urban-type settlement (daba) in the Autonomous Republic of Adjara, in southwestern Georgia, located  east of the regional capital Batumi.

The town has administrative, educational and health facilities, small businesses, and a museum of local history. Keda was a trading post in the 19th century. It was given the status of daba in 1966.

Population
At the beginning of 2021, Keda had a population of 1,285, a decrease of 15% since the 2014 census. According to the 2014 census, the town is practically mono-ethnic Georgian.

Transport 
Only one national route passes through Keda, the Sh1 Batumi - Akhaltsikhe, an important connection between Adjara and Samtskhe-Javakheti across the Goderdzi Pass. Keda is served by minibuses (marshutkas) from Batumi.

See also 
 List of municipalities in Georgia (country)
 Adjara

References

Cities and towns in Adjara
Batum Oblast